Toltingtrough (or Toltingtrow) was a hundred in the Lathe of Aylesford in the county of Kent, England. This hundred is called, in some ancient writings, Toltetern and Tollentr, and in Domesday, Tollentru. In the return made of the several knights fees throughout England, by inquisition into the exchequer, in the 7th year of king Edward I, the archbishop of Canterbury appears to have been then lord of this Hundred.

In the 20th year of king Edward III, on the levying 40 shillings on every knight's fee, this Hundred answered for four knights fees and a half.

The hundred included the parishes of
Gravesend
Ifield 
Luddesdown
Meopham 
Milton
Northfleet
Nurstead

The town of Gravesend & Milton was incorporated during the reign of Elizabeth I and encompassed the parishes of Gravesend and Milton. Milton civil parish was abolished in 1915.

Nurstead and Ifield civil parishes were abolished in 1935, when they were incorporated into Cobham.

The Borough of Gravesham created in 1974 contains the same area, plus Chalk, Higham, Shorne and Cobham.

The importance of the hundred courts declined from the 17th century, and most of their powers were extinguished with the establishment of county courts in 1867. In 1894 the Hundred was succeeded by Strood Rural District, the Urban District of Northfleet and the municipal borough of Gravesend.

The area and population of each parish and the totals for the Hundred were as follows:

Notes

Gravesham
Hundreds of Kent